Kleines Fiescherhorn or the Ochs is a mountain peak of the Bernese Alps, situated on the border between the cantons of Berne and Valais in Switzerland. Together with Grosses and Hinteres Fiescherhorn to the west they build the Fiescherhörner.

References

External links
 Klein Fiescherhorn on Hikr

Mountains of the Alps
Alpine three-thousanders
Mountains of Switzerland
Mountains of Valais
Mountains of the canton of Bern
Bern–Valais border
Bernese Alps
Three-thousanders of Switzerland